Karachi Breeze is a  is a network of bus rapid transit lines under construction in Karachi, Pakistan. Construction began in 2013, two lines are operational and two line is under construction as of September 2022, with 2 more planned. The projected ridership of the first line is estimated at 350,000 passengers per day, with a total of 109 km of dedicated bus routes. Upon completion, it will become the largest BRT network in Pakistan, and will connect to the Karachi Circular Railway.

History 
Nawaz Sharif, during a high-level meeting in Karachi on July 10, 2014, announced funds to launch the BRT Green Line to alleviate the severe traffic congestion in the city. The slow pace of work on BRT Green Line has irked citizens as the digging work on main arteries has resulted in congestion of traffic, which the former prime minister blamed on the Sindh government. In 2018, the name of the project was changed from Karachi Bus and Mass Rapid Transit system to Karachi Breeze.

Lines 
The system will be divided into 6 dedicated lines or "busways".

Green Line 

The Government of Pakistan financed the majority of the project. Construction of the Green Line began on February 26, 2016 ended in December 2021. The line has 22 bus stations. Engineering Associates had been contracted as the designers and supervision consultants for Green Line while a Consortium of "Ernest & Young", "Exponent Engineers" & "Haider Mota & BNR" had been contracted for "Transaction Advisory for Bus Operational Plan". The line is served by 80 18-metre-long buses. In addition, a Command and Control Centre is established at Garden West.

The green line:

 Numiash Station (to Blue Line)
 Patel Para (Guru Mandir) Station
 Lasbela Chowk Station
 Sanitary Market (Gulbahar) Station
 Nazimabad No.1 Station
 Enquiry Office Station
 Annu Bhai Park Station (to North Nazimabad KCR Station)
 Board Office Station ( to Orange Line )
 Hyderi Station
 Five Star Chowrangi Station
 Jummah Bazar Station
 Erum Shopping Station
 Nagan Chowrangi Station
 U.P. More Station
 Road 4200 (Saleem Centre) Station
 Power House Chowrangi Station
 Road 2400 (Aisha Complex) Station
 2 Minute Chowrangi Station
 4K Chowrangi Station
 Karimi Chowrangi Station
 KDA Flats Station
 Abdullah Chowk Terminal.

Orange Line 

The orange line, also called the Edhi Line in honour of philanthropist Abdul Sattar Edhi, is the shortest of the five line's, spreading over 3.9 km with only four stations within Orangi. The Orange line will be spread over 2.3 km, of which 0.7 km will be elevated while 1.5 km will be on ground, whereas, the 1.5 km will be semi dedicated section. The project is entirely funded and built by the Sindh government. It was started in 2016, but finally the project was completed in 10 sep 2022 . The project was criticized as being the only BRT line of the system that was not devised in conjunction with community input.

The line will have the capacity to carry up to 50,000 passengers daily, with a station located at every kilometer of its length. The line begins at Shahrah-e-Quaideen, near TMO Office, to Board Office, where it will join the Green Line BRT, through a rotary flyover.

The orange line:
 AO Chowk Terminal (to Green Line)
 Orangi Station (to Orangi KCR Station)
 Orangi Town Terminal

Blue Line 

The Blue Line will extend from Merewether Tower in central Karachi, to Bahria Town in northeast Karachi at a total length of  along Jahangir Road, and Shahrah-e-Pakistan to Sohrab Goth and onto Superhighway. It will be the first privately funded transport system in Pakistan being funded by the Bahria Town Group. Provincial Minister for Transport Syed Nasir Shah told Jang that the Blue Lines would have 9 stations and 3 of them would be underground. Under the project, 357,000 passengers will be able to travel annually.

The blue line:

 Merewether Tower Terminal
 Numaish Chowrangi Station (to Green Line)
 Liaquatabad Station (to Liaquatabad KCR Station)
 Bahria Town Terminal

Yellow Line 

The 22-kilometre-long Yellow Line project will connect Numaish Chowrangi near the Mazar-e-Quaid in central Karachi, to its eastern suburbs of Korangi and Landhi, terminating at Dawood Chowrangi. It has an estimated cost of $428 million, of which $382 million will be financed by the World Bank. It will be serviced by 268 buses and 28 stations, including 22 at grade and 6 underground. Construction of the line was delayed due to the global coronavirus pandemic, and is expected to start in 2022, with completion in 2025.

The yellow line:
 Numiash Chowrangi Terminal (to Blue Line/Green Line)
 Landhi Station Terminal (to Landhi KCR Station)

Red Line 

Construction of Red Line has been started and will connect central Karachi to its eastern suburbs.It will extend from Numaish Chowrangi near the Mazar-e-Quaid in central Karachi, to Malir Halt in eastern Karachi via University Road. The system will be a "third generation" BRT system in which local buses can enter/exit the system at designated points, to travel between city streets and the dedicated bus corridor. Construction was to start in August 2020, but was delayed to 2021 due to the global coronavirus pandemic, and was originally planned to be completed in 2022 at a cost of $503.2 million. The projected ridership of the system is 300,000 passengers per day.

It is the first transportation project in the world to receive funding from the UN Green Climate Fund for its use of biomethane from cow dung to power buses. A facility will be established at Cattle Colony to produce 11 tonnes of biogas per day for the line's 213 buses. A system of drains will also be built along the line to harvest rainwater for horticultural use, while the drains will also be perforated to allow rainwater to recharge water tables.

The red line:
 Regal Chowk Terminal (to Blue Line/Yellow Line)
 Regal Chowk Station Terminal (to KCR).

Brown Line 
Brown line BRT will start from Singer Chowrangi of Korangi Industrial Area. The first station of Brown line BRT is integrated with Yellow line BRT. Brown line BRT will pass through Shama Centre Shah Faisal Colony, Drigh Road where it has a combined station with Karachi Circular Railway (KCR), Nipa Chowrangi (combined station with Red Line and KCR), Sohrab Goth (combined station with Blue Line) and will end at Nagan Chowrangi (combined station with Green Line).

Fleet 
The government have acquired eighty 18-metre-long articulated buses for the Green Line, twenty 12-metre-long buses for the Orange Line and in process of acquiring twenty-five 18-metre-long articulated buses for the Green Line Extension project.

See also 
 Lahore Metrobus
 Rawalpindi-Islamabad Metrobus
 Multan Metrobus
 TransPeshawar
 List of rapid transit systems in Pakistan

References 

Bus rapid transit in Pakistan
Bus rapid transit
 
 Transport